Prep & Landing is a series of computer animated television specials produced by the Walt Disney Animation Studios. Voices of Dave Foley, Derek Richardson, Sarah Chalke and W. Morgan Sheppard are featured in the specials.

TV specials

"Prep & Landing" (2009) 

Wayne, a Christmas elf, is part of an elite organization known as "Prep & Landing", whose job is to ready millions of homes around the world for Santa Claus's visit. After working with "Prep & Landing" for two hundred twenty-seven years, Wayne looked forward to getting promoted. Instead, his former partner and trainee, Peterson, got the promotion, and Wayne is introduced to Lanny, a rookie whom Wayne has to also train. Wayne had been still bitter about the promotion, and decided to slack off during a mission. He permitted Lanny to do all of the work, which is disastrous. Meanwhile, Santa is informed mid-flight of a massive snow storm and that Wayne and Lanny have not fully prepared the house yet. He is told to cancel the landing, which has never happened before, when they promised to make it up for a boy named Timmy, who is living at the house. Wayne and Lanny discovered that the re-routing was a final decision, but after hearing Timmy thanking them in his sleep, Wayne decided to fix it. He called up Santa, telling him that he must land at Timmy's house. Wayne and Lanny then worked together to land Santa safely on Timmy's roof. On Christmas morning, Santa showed Wayne that Timmy had a merry Christmas. Santa offered a promotion to Wayne, but he turned it down so he can work with Lanny.

"Operation: Secret Santa" (2010) 

Wayne and Lanny, who are now partners, are called by Magee to meet with a secret contact, known as Mrs. Claus, who sent them on a new mission to retrieve a box from Santa's secret workshop. Later they sneaked into Santa's office while he is asleep, using their high tech equipment from the previous film. Lanny's expertise at dressing the tree enabled them to enter the hidden workshop where they recovered the box and escaped just in time. Mrs. Claus revealed the contents of the box to be the last part of the first toy that Santa had ever made, and gave the complete toy back to him as his Christmas Present.

"Naughty vs. Nice" (2011) 

The beginning of the special introduces the Coal Elf Brigade, a special unit of Christmas elves that are responsible for delivering lumps of coal to naughty children. While seeming cruel to some, the brigade added small, encouraging notes to the lumps such as "Try Harder next year," in an attempt to steer the children back to the nice list.

With the Big 2-5 fast approaching, Wayne and Lanny must race to recovered classified North Pole technology that has fallen into the hands of a hacker identified only as "JINGLESMELL1337". Desperate to prevent Christmas from descending into chaos, Wayne sought out, which is at the insistence of Magee, that the foremost Naughty Kid expert to aid in the mission, a bombastic member of the Coal Elf Brigade who also happens to be his estranged younger, but larger brother, Noel. Reluctant to take the extroverted Noel along with him, Wayne relents, and Noel joins the Prep & Landing team on the mission. During the trip, Noel and Wayne reminisce about their childhood, when they worked together far better than they do now. As the trio arrives at the hacker's house, Wayne sets off a booby trap, imperiling the entire team, when Wayne took a particular beating while Noel is able to defend himself. Lanny, however, is able to infiltrate the hacker's room, only to be taken captive after he accidentally "sparkled" himself.

The hacker then revealed herself to be Grace Goodwin, whose sole mission is to get herself off the naughty list, believing that she had been set up by her toddler brother, who had destroyed her favorite toy and ruined her chances to ask Santa for a new one by crying. After a somewhat intoxicated Lanny suggested that using the "magic word" to get the password for the device that will get her off the list, she does just that by using the word "please" as the password, since genuinely naughty kids never say "please." At first, she appeared successful in changing her status from naughty to nice, but the device malfunctions, threatening to place the entire planet on the naughty list unless she and the team can pull off a risky operation to fix the problem. Meanwhile, Wayne is particularly bitter at being "shown up" by his younger brother, prompting a fight in the street in front of Grace's house in which Wayne wished that he never had a brother. Shocked at his statement, Noel, who always idolized Wayne growing up, asked Wayne to say that he did not mean it, and threw what he had intended to give Wayne as a Christmas present at him. The gift, which is a toy sled that Wayne had wanted as a boy but was never able to get prompted Wayne to reconcile with Noel and carry out the mission. Grace, watching the whole argument as it unfolded, learned a powerful lesson and a newfound appreciation for her younger brother.

The next morning, the scene at the Goodwin house showed Grace's toddler brother giving her her new Christmas present, a replacement toy for the one he had destroyed a year prior. Meanwhile, back at the North Pole, Wayne and Noel both won the title of "Elves of the Year" for their efforts and cooperation.

Short film

Tiny's BIG Adventure 
A one-minute short film, titled Tiny's BIG Adventure, was released on-line on December 9, 2009, along with Prep & Landing. It was released on DVD on November 22, 2011, and on DVD/Blu-ray of Prep & Landing: Totally Tinsel Collection, on November 6, 2012.

Future 
Kevin Deters and Stevie Wermers, the directors of the specials, stated at the end of 2011 that another holiday TV special had been planned for the future. (In 2017, Deters and Wermers were involved in the production of Olaf's Frozen Adventure, which was set in the Frozen fictional universe and not part of the Prep & Landing series. A running gag involving fruitcake was carried over from Prep & Landing into Olaf's Frozen Aventure.)

Recurring characters 

 Note: A gray cell indicates character did not appear in that medium.

References

External links 
 

Christmas television specials
Computer-animated short films
Disney television specials
2000s American television specials
2010s American television specials
American Christmas television specials